Estella Atekwana (née Estella Akweseh Nkwate; born 13 September 1961) is a geophysicist studying biogeophysics and tectonophysics. She is currently Dean of the College of Letters and Science at University of California, Davis. She previously served as Dean of the College of Earth, Ocean and Environment at the University of Delaware. She is also an adjunct professor at both the University of Waterloo and the Missouri University of Science and Technology. Before joining the University of Delaware in 2017, she was the Department Head of the Boone Pickens School of Geology at Oklahoma State University. She is a Regents Distinguished Professor and a Clyde Wheeler Sun Endowed Chair at Oklahoma State University, where she maintains an adjunct appointment. Atekwana has also been a faculty member at Missouri University of Science & Technology, Indiana University-Purdue University Indianapolis, and Western Michigan University.

Biography 

Atekwana grew up in Cameroon and obtained her B.S. in Geology from Howard University in 1983 as a first-generation college student. At Howard University, Atekwana started in a pre-med program before switching to a geology major. She credits a teacher in the 1970s for inspiring her to pursue geology when they said that girls weren't suited for field work. She set out to prove the teacher wrong. After earning her B.S., Atekwana completed an M.S. in geology, also at Howard University in 1986. In 1991, Atekwana completed a Ph.D. in Geophysics at Dalhousie University in Halifax, Nova Scotia, Canada. After completing graduate school, she became an assistant professor at Western Michigan University. On a sabbatical in 1999, Atekwaka was a visiting professor at the University of Botswana. After leaving Western Michigan University in 2003, she taught at Indiana University – Purdue University Indianapolis and Missouri University of Science and Technology before starting at Oklahoma State University's Boone Pickens School of Geology in 2007.

Atekwana's efforts in diversity in the geosciences and capacity building in developing countries have been recognized with outstanding educator awards from both the Association for Women Geoscientists and the Society of Exploration Geophysicists. She serves on numerous professional committees including the American Geophysical Union (AGU) Honors and Awards committee  and the U.S. National Committee for the International Union of Geological Sciences (IUGS).

Research interests 

Atekwana is a pioneer in the multidisciplinary field of Biogeophysics, which uses geophysics to understand the biogeochemical interactions occurring at contaminated sites. Atekwana's biogeophysical research investigates the effects of microbial-mediated processes on geological media. Some of her research evaluates the utility and resolution of in situ resistivity measurements combined with surface geoelectrical measurements to map contaminant distribution in the subsurface. Atekwana also uses the geoelectric and geophysical signatures of contaminated sites to investigate relationships between biological processes and their impact on electrical properties of geologic material. 

Atekwana also uses geophysics to investigate tectonic processes. Her geophysical studies reveal crust and upper mantle structures that inform the geodynamic processes associated with incipient rifting of continental crust.  For example, Atekwana and colleagues show how geophysically imaged pre-existing basement structures in Malawi and Botswana influenced strain localization during early rifting. Another case study from the nascent Okavango rift in northwest Botswana provides evidence that pre-existing basement structures control rifting.

Atekwana is also involved in a project to use smartphones with geophysical sensors to potentially provide a more affordable approach to the acquisition of geophysical data, highlighting the application at academic institutions with limited access to expensive geophysical equipment.

Awards and honors 

Society of Exploration Geophysicists 2020 Virtual Near Surface Global Lecturer. 
Association for Women Geoscientists 2019 Outstanding Educator. 
 Outstanding Educator Award, Society of Exploration Geophysicists (2016). 
 Elected Fellow of the Geological Society of America 2016. 
 Eminent Faculty Award, Oklahoma State University (2015).

Selected publications 
Atewkana has written over 100 publications including:

 

Estella Atekwana serves as an Associate Editor for the American Geophysical Union's Journal of Geophysical Research - Biogeosciences and serves on the editorial advisory board of the Journal of African Earth Sciences

References

External links 

Dalhousie University alumni
University of Delaware faculty
1961 births
Living people
Geophysicists
Cameroonian scientists
Cameroonian women scientists
Howard University alumni
Oklahoma State University faculty
Academic staff of the University of Waterloo
Missouri University of Science and Technology faculty
Women geophysicists
Women geologists